Daniel Palmer may refer to:

 Daniel David Palmer (1845–1913), founder of chiropractic
 Daniel S. Palmer (born 1984), American curator
 Daniel Palmer (writer) (born 1962), American novelist
 Daniel Palmer (politician) (born 1997)